The 1995–96 Washington Capitals season was the Capitals' 22nd season of play.

Off-season
The Capitals changed colors from red, white and blue to brown and blue.

Regular season

The Capitals tied the Detroit Red Wings for most shutouts for (9) during the regular season.

Final standings

Schedule and results

Playoffs
The Capitals Made the playoffs, but lost the opening round series 4-2 to the Penguins.

Capitals' playoff results

Game 1--Wednesday, April 17, 1996--Washington 6, at Pittsburgh 4
Game 2--Friday, April 19, 1996--Washington 5, at Pittsburgh 3
Game 3--Monday, April 22, 1996--Pittsburgh 4, at Washington 1
Game 4--Wednesday, April 24, 1996--Pittsburgh 3, at Washington 2 (4 OT)
Game 5--Friday, April 26, 1996--Washington 1, at Pittsburgh 4
Game 6--Sunday, April 28, 1996--Pittsburgh 3, at Washington 2
(Pittsburgh Penguins win series, 4-2)

Player statistics

Regular season
Scoring

Goaltending

Playoffs
Scoring

Goaltending

Note: GP = Games played; G = Goals; A = Assists; Pts = Points; +/- = Plus/minus; PIM = Penalty minutes; PPG=Power-play goals; SHG=Short-handed goals; GWG=Game-winning goals
      MIN=Minutes played; W = Wins; L = Losses; T = Ties; GA = Goals against; GAA = Goals against average; SO = Shutouts; SA=Shots against; SV=Shots saved; SV% = Save percentage;

Draft picks
Washington's draft picks at the 1995 NHL Entry Draft held at the Edmonton Coliseum in Edmonton, Alberta.

See also
 1995–96 NHL season

References
 

W
W
Washington Capitals seasons
Cap
Cap